Barney Ronay is an English journalist and author. He is the chief sports writer for The Guardian, and has regularly appeared on The Guardians Football Weekly podcast and at the Football Weekly live shows.

Ronay has written for the New Statesman, When Saturday Comes, The Cricketer, and The Blizzard.

Ronay has written several books. How Football (Almost) Came Home: Adventures in Putin's World Cup was published by HarperCollins in November 2018. The Manager: The Absurd Ascent of the Most Important Man in Football,  was published in 2010 and was named book of the week by The Independent, Any Chance of a Game? A Season at the Ugly End of Park Football was published in 2006. He also co-authored the WSC Companion to Football.

Ronay was a highly influential campaigner against plans by  Lewisham council that he felt could harm Millwall FC.

In 2014, he was named the 29th most influential Twitter user in UK football. On 10 October 2018 Ronay was included in a list of the 238 most respected journalists working in Britain as published by the National Council for the Training of Journalists.

On 31 October 2018 it was announced that Ronay had been nominated in the ‘writer of the year’ category at the 2018 Football Supporters Federation Awards, which he subsequently won ahead of Jonathan Liew and Jonathan Northcroft amongst others. At the 2020 Sports Journalists’ Association awards Ronay was named best football journalist. Ronay and Liew have written a TV series called The Red Zone which was set to be shown on Netflix in 2021, executive produced by Sam Mendes. However, in March 2022 the project was announced as discontinued. In November 2022 he won ‘writer of the year’ at the Football Supporters' Association awards.

Personal life
Ronay was born and raised in South East London, and is of Austrian and Jewish descent, whose grandparents fled during the rise of the Nazis in Austria. He was educated at Oxford University. He is a supporter of Millwall F.C..

References

English sports journalists
English podcasters
English male non-fiction writers
Journalists from London
British Jews
21st-century English male writers
The Guardian journalists